Yemenite (Arabic: يماني‎, romanized: Yamāni) is someone whose ancestors are from Yemen, or something that is linked to Yemen. It may refer to:

Al-Yamani, a pre-messianic figure in Shia Islamic eschatology
Yemenite Hebrew, dialect of the Hebrew language
Yemenite Jews
Yemenite Kaaba
Yemenite step, an Israeli folk dance step originating from Yemen

See also
Yemen (disambiguation)